The 6th International 300-Mile Sweepstakes Race was the sixth running of the Indianapolis 500. It was held at the Indianapolis Motor Speedway on Tuesday, May 30, 1916.

Although the common belief is that the race distance was changed due to the onset of World War I, it was in fact Speedway management that changed the distance in order to make the race shorter and more appealing to fans. Despite the one-time altered distance, the race is still considered part of the continuous lineage of the Memorial Day classic, known as the Indianapolis 500. In addition to the altered distance, the start time was moved from 10:00 a.m. to the early afternoon (1:30 p.m.)

Eddie Rickenbacker took the lead at the start, and led the first nine laps until dropping out with steering problems. Dario Resta led 103 of the 120 laps, and claimed the victory. Resta was accompanied by riding mechanic Bob Dahnke.

Seven of the cars were entered by the Speedway or its owners, in order to ensure a strong field during the war. None of them finished in the top five. Despite the promoter's entries, the field consisted of only 21 cars, the smallest in Indy history.

World War I
Three months after the 1916 race, on Labor Day weekend of 1916, the Speedway held a second event, the Harvest Auto Racing Classic. The 1917 race was scheduled to return to 500 miles, but a dispute with the local hoteliers and the escalation of World War I intervened. On March 23, 1917, Speedway management cancelled the 1917 Indianapolis 500, and halted racing at the facility for both 1917 and 1918.

The track was offered as a landing strip and maintenance/refueling station for military aircraft traveling between Wilbur Wright Field and Chanute Air Force Base. It was referred to as the Speedway Aviation Repair Depot, and the 821st Aero Repair Squadron was stationed there. In addition, several experimental aircraft were tested at the grounds. At least one test pilot was fatally injured in a plane crash at the track.

No racing of any kind took place at the Indianapolis Motor Speedway in 1917–1918. Likewise, the National Championship was suspended in both 1917 and 1918. There were, however, AAA races (non-championship races) conducted during the war years at other tracks. On Memorial Day 1917, a 250-mile race was held at Cincinnati.

The Indianapolis 500 resumed after the war in 1919.

Box score

Race details
For 1916, riding mechanics were required.
In the weeks and months leading up to the race, Speedway president Carl G. Fisher had expressed concern and disdain over the local hoteliers' practice of price gouging customers during the race week. It reached a boiling point where Fisher threatened to move the 1916 and/or 1917 Memorial Day 500-mile race to a board track in Cincinnati, Ohio. Ultimately, a truce was reached, and the race(s) were not moved. Apropos to that, the 1917 Indianapolis 500 was cancelled anyway shortly after the entry blanks were mailed out, due to the escalation of World War I.
Driver Jack LeCain was forced to miss the race due to a broken crankshaft suffered during a practice run two days before the race. He drove relief for Delage teammate Jules Devigne, taking over shortly beyond the 100-mile mark. After 61 laps, he suffered a serious crash, leaving him critically injured.
1915 winner Ralph DePalma withheld his entry for 1916, demanding $5,000 in appearance money from Speedway management.  Carl Fisher refused to accede to the demand, and DePalma's subsequent entry blank, filed after the deadline, was rejected.

Notes

Works cited
"New Planes for Old" - The Work of the Aviation Repair Depots: Aerial Ace Weekely, 1 September 1919

References

Indianapolis 500 races
Indianapolis 500
Indianapolis 500
Indianapolis
1916 in American motorsport
May 1916 sports events